Barc or BARC may refer to:

Institutions
 Bay Area Reference Center, a former US public library service
 Beltsville Agricultural Research Center
 Bhabha Atomic Research Centre, an Indian nuclear research facility
 Bradford Amateur Rowing Club
 British Automobile Racing Club
 BARC, the stock symbol of Barclays on the London Stock Exchange
 Broadcast Audience Research Council, television audience measurement service in India

Vessels and vehicles
 Barque
 BARC speeder, a fictional vehicle in the Star Wars universe
 BARC from "Barge, Amphibious, Resupply, Cargo" vehicle; aka LARC-LX

Places
 Barc, Eure, a French commune in the Eure department
 Barç, a village in Korçë County, Albania

See also